Iphitos or Īphitus (Ancient Greek: Ἴφιτος) is the name of six individuals in Greek mythology.

Iphitos, son of Eurytus, king of Oechalia. As Iole's brother, he was Heracles' brother-in-law and, according to one version of the myth, also his lover.

Iphitos, son of Naubolus and king of Phocis, others say his father was the son of Hippasus from Peloponessus. He entertained Jason when he consulted the Delphic Oracle and later joined the Argonauts. Iphitus an ally of Thebans in the war of the Seven against Thebes. He was the leader of men from Phocis and the cities of Panope, Daulis, Cyparissos, Lebadia and Hyampolis during the war. By his wife Hippolyte or Thrasybule, Iphitos became the father of Schedius and Epistrophus who led the Phocians in the Trojan war.

Iphitos, an Elean who was killed by Copreus, son of Pelops, who fled from Elis after the murder and later on was purified by King Eurystheus in Mycenae. According to the writer Alcman, Iphitos along with Lycurgus, belonged to the participants in the first Olympic Games.

Iphitus, father of Eurynome, who was the mother of King Adrastus of Argos, one of the Seven against Thebes.

Iphitos, an elderly Trojan during the Trojan War. In Book VIII of the Iliad, his son Archeptolemus suddenly becomes the charioteer of Hector when Eniopeus was killed by Diomedes. However, Teucer killed him in the same battle. In Aeneid Book II, Aeneas named Iphitos among half a dozen Trojan heroes who fight by his side during the fall of Troy. When the battle turned against them, Iphitos was the only one of these who remained standing. He was apparently by Aeneas's side until King Priam was killed. In some accounts, Iphitos was also the father of Coeranus who was killed by Odysseus.

Iphitos, king of Elis, restored the Olympic Games after the Dorian invasion. The restoration came after he asked the Oracle at Delphi about what should be done to save Greece from civil war and the diseases that were killing the population. The Oracle answered: "Iphitos and the people of Elis must declare a sacred truce for the duration of the game and revive the Olympic Games".

Notes

References 

 Gaius Julius Hyginus, Fabulae from The Myths of Hyginus translated and edited by Mary Grant. University of Kansas Publications in Humanistic Studies. Online version at the Topos Text Project.
 Gaius Valerius Flaccus, Argonautica translated by Mozley, J H. Loeb Classical Library Volume 286. Cambridge, MA, Harvard University Press; London, William Heinemann Ltd. 1928. Online version at theio.com.
 Gaius Valerius Flaccus, Argonauticon. Otto Kramer. Leipzig. Teubner. 1913. Latin text available at the Perseus Digital Library.
 Homer, The Iliad with an English Translation by A.T. Murray, Ph.D. in two volumes. Cambridge, MA., Harvard University Press; London, William Heinemann, Ltd. 1924. Online version at the Perseus Digital Library.
 Homer, Homeri Opera in five volumes. Oxford, Oxford University Press. 1920. Greek text available at the Perseus Digital Library.
 Pseudo-Apollodorus, The Library with an English Translation by Sir James George Frazer, F.B.A., F.R.S. in 2 Volumes, Cambridge, MA, Harvard University Press; London, William Heinemann Ltd. 1921. Online version at the Perseus Digital Library. Greek text available from the same website.
 Publius Ovidius Naso, Metamorphoses translated by Brookes More (1859-1942). Boston, Cornhill Publishing Co. 1922. Online version at the Perseus Digital Library.
 Publius Ovidius Naso, Metamorphoses. Hugo Magnus. Gotha (Germany). Friedr. Andr. Perthes. 1892. Latin text available at the Perseus Digital Library.
 Publius Papinius Statius, The Thebaid translated by John Henry Mozley. Loeb Classical Library Volumes. Cambridge, MA, Harvard University Press; London, William Heinemann Ltd. 1928. Online version at the Topos Text Project.
 Publius Papinius Statius, The Thebaid. Vol I-II. John Henry Mozley. London: William Heinemann; New York: G.P. Putnam's Sons. 1928. Latin text available at the Perseus Digital Library.
 Publius Vergilius Maro, Aeneid. Theodore C. Williams. trans. Boston. Houghton Mifflin Co. 1910. Online version at the Perseus Digital Library.
 Publius Vergilius Maro, Bucolics, Aeneid, and Georgics. J. B. Greenough. Boston. Ginn & Co. 1900. Latin text available at the Perseus Digital Library.
Tzetzes, John, Allegories of the Iliad translated by Goldwyn, Adam J. and Kokkini, Dimitra. Dumbarton Oaks Medieval Library, Harvard University Press, 2015. 

Kings of Phocis
Kings in Greek mythology
Argonauts
Trojans
Characters in the Argonautica
Phocian characters in Greek mythology
Achaean characters in Greek mythology